Val 202 is a public-owned Slovenian radio station.

Overview 
The station is the second station of the public broadcaster Radio Slovenija and one of the most listened-to stations in Slovenia. It broadcasts indie and pop music, news and phone-in programmes. Val 202 is famous for its sports coverages and commentaries.

Name 
Formerly it used to broadcast on AM frequency 1484 kHz - equal to 202 metres wavelength, hence the name Val 202 ("val" means "wave" in Slovene).

References

External links
 

Radio stations in Slovenia
Radiotelevizija Slovenija